Aringa, also known as Low Lugbara, is a Central Sudanic language or dialect spoken by the Aringa people in the West Nile region of Uganda. It is related to the language spoken by the Lugbara and Madi peoples.

Aringa is considered a dialect of Lugbara language, other times a separate language The speakers of Lugbara and Ma'di both consider Aringa to be a separate but related language. There are several divergent forms: Andre, Kuluba, and Lebati.

References

 

Moru-Madi languages
Languages of Uganda